Wendy Baker (born March 10, 1964 in Montreal, Quebec) is a former field hockey goalkeeper from Canada. She was a member of the Women's Senior National Team, which finished sixth at the 1988 Olympic Games in Seoul, South Korea.

International Senior Tournaments
 1987 — Champions Trophy, Amstelveen (4th place)
 1988 — Olympic Games, Seoul (6th place)

References
Canadian Olympic Committee

External links
 

1964 births
Living people
Canadian female field hockey players
Female field hockey goalkeepers
Olympic field hockey players of Canada
Field hockey people from Quebec
Field hockey players at the 1988 Summer Olympics
Sportspeople from Montreal
Pan American Games medalists in field hockey
Pan American Games bronze medalists for Canada
Field hockey players at the 1987 Pan American Games
Medalists at the 1987 Pan American Games